KLMZ (107.1 FM) is a radio station licensed to Leadwood, Missouri. The station broadcasts a classic rock format and is owned by Fred Dockins, through licensee Dockins Communications, Inc.

References

External links
KLMZ's website

LMZ
Classic rock radio stations in the United States
Radio stations established in 2010
2010 establishments in Missouri